Real Magic TV, commonly known as “RMTV”, is an interactive television series that features magic with musicians and celebrities. In addition to the magic, RMTV features acoustic sessions with recording artists. The show's main focus is on following close-up magician Jonathan Real as he performs for small audiences that often includes musicians and actors. RMTV presents a candid look behind the scenes as the interactions between Jonathan and popular stars take place. The show is a promotion tool used by musicians, actors and other celebrities to promote their newest works to the show's target teen demographic.

The show has been featured on CNN and FUSE TV. The show is currently featured on Hulu's online network.

About the show
The Real Magic series was born out of a film project produced in support of the Twin Towers Fund in 2001. The original film Real Magic New York debuted on a 6-story IMAX screen, documenting Jonathan's travels as he raised not only money but the spirits of New Yorkers he came in contact with. After performing for veteran hard rockers Sevendust and singer/songwriter Howie Day in the film, the popularity of Jonathan's performances grew through word of mouth among touring artists, publicists and labels. Jonathan gained the nickname “the musician’s magician.” Demand grew from record labels (Island/Def Jam, Universal, etc.) wanting their bands to be featured on a Real Magic project with Jonathan Real. In response to the demand, the Real Magic TV series was created.

Real Magic TV interviews take a different approach than most programs. The interview begins with magic. RMTV shows celebrities laughing, shouting, screaming — doing all the things they rarely do in a regular interview. Next, Jonathan asks the band fan submitted questions — historically submitted via email, text message and through RMTV's official website.

Distribution history
The Real Magic series broadcasts began on closed-circuit college TV networks in New York, Philadelphia and Delaware in 2002. After having the band Evanescence make a guest appearance on the program, demand for RMTV outgrew its distribution footprint, and producers scrambled to respond to tens-of-thousands of requests worldwide.

In the fall of 2003, Real Magic TV began to distribute programs through online video streaming. Viewers from all 50 states and 60+ countries were tracked in the first 2 months of broadcasting.

In 2005, Real Magic TV began producing segments of RMTV for the Fuse TV Network. Fuse featured the segments on Daily Download, their highest rated TV show, as well as their official website (fuse.tv).

In 2007, RMTV was one of the first 300 companies to become part of YouTube's pilot program for Content Partners, reaching new heights and garnering record numbers of hits on the popular video sharing site.

Also in 2007, RMTV was asked their permission for Apple to feature their iPhone application. It was one of the first 500 applications that apple.com ever featured, reaching tens of thousands of users daily. This feature came almost a year before the Apple App Store was launched.

As of August 12, 2010, RMTV formed a distribution partnership with Hulu. Through this partnership RMTV has broadened its online streaming to include AOL, MySpace, MSN, Yahoo, Fancast, IMDb, TV Guide Online, Television Without Pity, myYearbook, Flixster, Dailymotion, Facebook (Slide), RockYou and more.

About the host
Jonathan Real, a native of Westchester County in New York State, became enamored with magic at a surprisingly early age. Unbeknownst to his parents, their gift of a magic kit for his fourth birthday would propel him into a career as a magician.

In addition to his lifelong interest in magic, Jonathan has also focused his attention on  the art of music.

Jonathan's continued commitment to community and encouragement around youth learning recently got him appointed as the new Director of the Society of Young Magicians (SYM) in Stamford, CT. At the society Jonathan teaches kids 7-17 how to perform and make magic a part of their lives. Jonathan is only the second person in the club's 22-year history to hold this post. He was asked to take over the role in 2009, by the group's founder and past national president of the Society of American Magicians, Bill Andrews. He now leads the group of young and aspiring magicians in monthly meetings.

Official website
Real Magic TV's Official site includes information on upcoming interview, current episodes, episode archives, up & comers, Weekly Top 3, as well as a biography of the host.(1)

Weekly Top 3 A recap of the top 3 most viewed Real Magic TV episodes. This show is live every Wednesday night.
Up & Comers A section of the site that puts local bands up with the big names. Bands get their music on the site, a mention on the live show, and syndicate sample of their mp3s are featured on the Real Magic TV's exclusive iPhone / iPod Touch application.
Interact Fans can select an upcoming guest from a list, type in a question or two that they'd like answered and RMTV will bring the questions to the artist. Real Magic TV also offers their Win A Call program where one of their guests might call a fan.
Magic with Your Stuff Jonathan creates magic effects using random stuff that fans send him. The segments are done during the weekly live shows and backstage with celebrities. Viewers can send in objects to Real Magic TV's submission address: P.O. Box 422, Wilton, CT 06897.

Featured artists

(1) http://www.realmagictv.com
(2) https://www.youtube.com/realmagictv
(3) http://www.facebook.com/realmagictv
(4) https://www.imdb.com/title/tt0389675/
(5) http://www.jonathanreal.com/

American television magic shows